Zobrist is a surname. Notable people with the surname include:

Albert Lindsey Zobrist (born 1942), American computer scientist, games researcher, and inventor
Ben Zobrist (born 1981), American baseball player
Julianna Zobrist (born 1984), American musician